William Charles Hopkinson (1880–1914) was an Indian police officer and later an immigration inspector in the Canadian Immigration Branch in Vancouver, British Columbia, who is noted for his role in infiltration and intelligence on the Ghadarite movement in North America in the early 1900s.

Early life
Hopkinson was born in Delhi on June 16, 1880.  His father, William Hopkinson, was then a sergeant instructor of volunteers at Allahabad.  His mother, Agnes Hopkinson, may have been an Indian woman, who used a European name. Raised in India, he spoke Hindi, but did not speak Punjabi well.  He turned to others for translation of materials written in the Gurmukhi script.

Intelligence work
In 1903 or 1904, he became an inspector of police in Calcutta. Hopkinson came to Canada in late 1907 or early 1908, officially on leave, but pursuing investigations for the Criminal Intelligence Department in India.

In February 1909, he was hired by the Immigration Branch (part of the Department of the Interior), as an immigration inspector and interpreter.  He later became chief assistant to the Canadian inspector of immigration. Hopkinson continued to work for the police in India.  He reported to the deputy minister of the Interior in Ottawa and to J. A. Wallinger, Agent of the Government of India in London.  He was also retained by the U.S. immigration service.

By 1910 Hopkinson was actively involved in monitoring the Indian immigration and the nationalistic separatist opinions and outlets in North America, especially Canada, and was the principal agent responsible for comprehensive British intelligence in the Pacific coast.

He openly attended public meetings in British Columbia and down the coast in Washington, Oregon and California, to gather information on Indian nationalists and separatists. He used a network of assets to provide additional information on various terrorist and separatist groups. During that time he was subjected to accusations of bribery and to threats by the objects of his intelligence work, although it has been stated that in fact this was done due to his refusal to accept bribes or to be threatened by these subjects.
Hopkinson was successful in infiltrating the Ghadarite movement after its conception, and in 1914 he was involved in the Komagata Maru incident.

Komagata Maru incident and aftermath
During the incident, he acted as an interpreter for the Immigration Branch when passengers were questioned.

In mid-July, 1914, prior to the departure of the Komagata Maru, a local Ghadarite, Mewa Singh, was arrested while re-entering Canada from Sumas, Washington, attempting to bring weapons into Canada. Hopkinson helped to secure his release with a minor fine. 

On August 31, 1914, one of Hopkinson's informants, Harnam Singh, was found murdered in Vancouver. On September 3, another informant, Arjan Singh, was shot dead in Vancouver. On September 5, another informant, Bela Singh, was arrested and subsequently charged with murder for killing two local Ghaderites, in what he claimed was self-defence.

Death
 
On October 21, 1914, Hopkinson attended the provincial courthouse on West Georgia Street in Vancouver. He was there to testify at Bela Singh's murder trial, where he was expected to give evidence concerning threats made against Bela Singh, including death threats made by one of the victims. While waiting outside a courtroom, Hopkinson was assassinated by Mewa Singh. For Bhai Mewa Singh the turning came on September 15, when he witnessed a man named Bela (who worked as an informant for the Canadian immigration department) enter the Gurdwara on West Second Avenue and was attacked and forced to shoot two Sikhs: Bhai Bhag Singh and Bhai Battan Singh. Bhai Mewa Singh, like many Sikhs, was devastated by this event especially with their source of weapons cut off and he planned to testify in revenge.

However, Bhai Mewa Singh Ji did not waver; he testified in court that Bela had shot Bhai Bhag Singh Ji and Bhai Battan Singh Ji from behind without any prior provocation. After giving this testimony Bhai Mewa Singh Ji claimed he was threatened once again by a mole named Babu who worked for inspector Hopkinson, although no evidence of this ever was provided. Bhai Mewa Singh continued to make claims he was told that the next time he was seen walking the streets of Vancouver that he would be shot dead.

Bhai Mewa Singh held inspector Hopkinson responsible for interfering in the efforts of the radical separatist group. And when Mr. Hopkinson was to appear in court on October 21, 1914, to testify in favor of Bela. Bhai Mewa Singh Ji went to court that same day and shot and killed inspector Hopkinson to prevent him from testifying.  After shooting inspector Hopkinson, Bhai Mewa Singh dropped his weapons and surrendered to the authorities. Bhai Mewa Singh Ji was put on trial for the murder of Officer Hopkinson. The presiding judge found him guilty of killing an inspector and Bhai Mewa Singh Ji was sentenced to death by hanging.

References

Bibliography

.
.
.
.

External links
 Komagata Maru: Continuing the Journey website

1880 births
1914 deaths
Deaths by firearm in British Columbia
Male murder victims
Indian police officers
People from Delhi
Hindu–German Conspiracy
History of immigration to Canada
Assassinated Indian people
People murdered in British Columbia
Indian people murdered abroad
Assassinated police officers
1914 murders in Canada
Immigration to British Columbia